Jason Parsons is a Canadian DJ and producer who works under the name Human Kebab.

Biography
Raised in Stouffville, Ontario Canada, Parsons resides in Toronto. He forms one half of Canadian alternative rock musical act USS. Parsons has contributed writing and production to all USS recordings as well as to fellow Canadian artist Lights on her second album, Siberia, and her subsequent release, Little Machines, in 2014.

As Human Kebab, Parsons hosts and DJ's two alternative rock radio remix shows. The first, SubSONiC, began in 2013 in Edmonton, Alberta on Sonic 102.9, followed by Rock Paper Mixers on KXRN-LP in Laguna Beach, California three years later.

Parsons has performed multiple times as a DJ alongside Canadian hip hop artist Maestro Fresh-Wes.

Peaking at #27 on Canada's Alternative Rock chart in April 2013, the song "Weird Science" by Toronto-based electro-rock band Most Non Heinous was co-written by Parsons.

In the summer of 2012, Kebab was featured on the track "Livin' Tonight" by fellow Canadian modern rock act illScarlett.

Parsons provided some production work to Elise LeGrow on her song "Weed and Wine". He also performed some drum programming duties for Suzie McNeil on her 2012 album Dear Love (2012).

The Zone 91.3 CJZN-FM in Victoria, British Columbia had Parsons host their annual one-hour special Inside Rifflandia (hosted by Human Kebab of USS) in September 2013.

In September 2019, Parsons performed at several Summersault Festival shows with Our Lady Peace, Bush, Live, and Dear Rouge, among others.

In November 2021, Parsons began the final tour with Ash Buchholz as the duo Ubiquitous Synergy Seeker.

References

External links
 
 USS official website

Year of birth missing (living people)
Living people
People from Whitchurch-Stouffville
Canadian DJs
Musicians from Ontario
Canadian male voice actors